Kachkynchy is a village in Jalal-Abad Region of Kyrgyzstan. Its population was 4,468 in 2021. Administratively, it is part of the city Jalal-Abad.

References
 

Populated places in Jalal-Abad Region